Nga Yiu Tau is the name of several places in Hong Kong:
 Nga Yiu Tau, North District in Sha Tau Kok, North District
 Nga Yiu Tau, Tai Po District in Tai Po District
 Nga Yiu Tau, Yuen Long District in Yuen Long District